Greens Equo (and formerly Q or eQuo) is a Spanish political party founded on 4 June 2011, when 35 Spanish green parties agreed to merge into Equo. It began as a foundation on 24 September 2010 with the goal of becoming "the seed and source of debate about political ecology and social equity, originating a sociopolitical movement".

History 
The first election it contested was the 2011 Spanish general election, obtaining 216,748 votes (0.9%), making it the 9th most supported party. The party was fifth in Madrid, achieving representation thanks to the Valencian coalition Compromís-Q, in which Equo participated.

At the national elections of 20 December 2015, Equo joined the list of Podemos. This resulted in seats for three Equo candidates: Juantxo López de Uralde, Rosa Martínez and Jorge Luis Bail.

In the run up to the November 2019 Spanish general election, Equo withdrew from Unidas Podemos and agreed an electoral fusion with Más País. Disagreeing with this decision and willing to stay with Unidas Podemos, Equo founder Juanxto López de Uralde left the party and founded Green Aliance.

In 2021, the party decided to change its name to Greens Equo.

Electoral performance

Cortes Generales

 * Within Podemos—En Comú Podem–És el moment–En Marea.
 ** Within Unidos Podemos.
 *** In coalition with Más País.

See also 

 Renewable energy

References

 
2011 establishments in Spain
Ecofeminism
Ecosocialist parties
Green political parties in Spain
European Green Party
Political parties established in 2011
Socialist parties in Spain